Cannone is an Italian surname. Notable people with the surname include:

Cosimo Aldo Cannone (born 1984), Italian motorboat racer
Domenico Cannone (born 1973), Italian sprint canoeist
Flavio Cannone (born 1981), Italian trampolinist
Giuseppe Cannone (born c. 1924), Italian rugby league player
Patrick Cannone (born 1986), American ice hockey player
Romain Cannone (born 1997), French fencer

Italian-language surnames